Conny Waßmuth (also spelled Wassmuth; born 4 April 1983 in Halle an der Saale) is a German sprint canoer who has competed since 2005. She won a gold medal in the K-4 500 m event at the 2008 Summer Olympics in Beijing.

Waßmuth also won eight medals at the ICF Canoe Sprint World Championships with five golds (K-1 4 x 200 m: 2009, 2010; K-4 200 m: 2007, 2009; K-4 500 m: 2005, 2007) and two silvers (K-4 200 m and K-4 500 m: both 2006).

In June 2015, she competed in the inaugural European Games, for Germany in canoe sprint, more specifically, Women's K-4 500m with Verena Hantl, Franziska Weber, and Tina Dietze. She earned a silver medal.

At the 2016 Summer Olympics, she competed in the women's K-1 200 metres event. She was eliminated in the semifinals.

References

External links
 
 
 
 
 
 

1983 births
Living people
Canoeists at the 2008 Summer Olympics
Canoeists at the 2016 Summer Olympics
German female canoeists
Olympic canoeists of Germany
Olympic gold medalists for Germany
Olympic medalists in canoeing
ICF Canoe Sprint World Championships medalists in kayak
Medalists at the 2008 Summer Olympics
European Games medalists in canoeing
Canoeists at the 2015 European Games
European Games silver medalists for Germany
Canoeists at the 2019 European Games